Istanbul Pride is a pride parade and LGBT demonstration held annually in Turkey's biggest city, Istanbul since 2003. Participants assemble in Taksim Square before marching the entire length of İstiklal Avenue. It has been described as the first and biggest LGBT event in the Muslim-majority countries.

The event reached roughly 5,000 people by 2010. In 2013, the pride parade, with the attendance of Gezi Park protesters attracted almost 100,000 people. The 2014 pride was the biggest LGBT event in Turkey's history and attracted more than 100,000 people. Since 2015 pride parades in Istanbul were denied permission by the Governorship of Istanbul authorities. The governors repeatedly stated that the denials were based on security concerns and public order, but critics claimed the bans were taken on a religious and ideological basis. Despite the refusal hundreds of people defied the ban each year, which resulted in law enforcement intervention.

Politicians that have joined Istanbul Pride are mainly from the opposition parties Republican People's Party (CHP) and Peoples' Democratic Party (HDP).

History 

The event first took place in 2003 and now occurs each year on either the last Sunday of June or the first Sunday of July, to mark the end of Istanbul pride week. About 30 people took part in the first Gay Pride Istanbul. The numbers have increased exponentially each year, reaching roughly 5,000 people by 2010. The 2011 gathering attracted over 10,000 people, therefore making Gay Pride Istanbul the biggest march of its kind in the Muslim majority countries. The 2012 pride march, which took place on 1 July, attracted between 10,000 and 30,000 people.On 30 June 2013, the pride parade attracted almost 100,000 people. The protesters were joined by Gezi Park protesters, making the 2013 Istanbul Pride the biggest pride ever held in Turkey. The 2014 pride attracted more than 100,000 people. The European Union praised Turkey that the parade went ahead without disruption.

Suppression since 2015 
On Sunday 29 June 2015, Reuters reported that Turkish police used a water cannon to disperse the gay pride parade. In 2016 the pride march was banned by the local government "for the safety of our citizens, first and foremost the participants’, and for public order." LGBT organizations have also not been allowed to make a press statement. The governate of Istanbul once again claimed that a gathering of LGBT would not be allowed. "Within Law No: 5442, this request has not been approved due to the terror attacks that have taken place in our country and the area; because provocative acts and events may take place when the sensitivities that have emerged in society are taken into account; and because it may cause a disruption in public order and the people's- including the participants of the event- tranquility, security, and welfare.". Supporters of the Pride claimed this decision was religiously motivated and the event was banned because it would have take during the Muslim holy month of Ramadan.

In 2017 the Istanbul Governor's Office yet again banned the LGBT Pride Parade, citing security concerns and public order.

In 2018, for the fourth consecutive year the Istanbul Governor's Office yet again banned the LGBT Pride Parade, citing security concerns and public order, but around 1,000 people defied the ban, they were met with tear gas and rubber bullets. 11 participants were arrested.

In 2019, the Istanbul Governor's Office yet again banned the LGBT Pride Parade, citing security concerns and public order. subsequently, opposition Member of the Grand National Assembly Sezgin Tanrıkulu of the Republican People's Party (CHP) lodged a parliamentary question to the Vice President of Turkey Fuat Oktay asking why the deputy governor of Istanbul had banned Istanbul Pride. He also asked how many LGBT members had been killed in the last 17 years, the time the ruling party Justice and Development Party (AKP) ruled the city, due to provocative hate speech, and raised concerns over discrimination against the LGBT community. On 29 June, hundreds of people defied the ban, they were met with tear gas, shields, pepper gas and plastic bullets from the Police.

Organizers 
LGBT organizations

Koç Üniversitesi "KUir" LGBTI+ Club
 Bahçeşehir Üniversitesi “Gri (Gender roles and identities)” Kulübü
 Bilkent Üniversitesi Think colorful! LGBTQ student's Society
 Bilgi Gökkuşağı LGBT student's Society
 Hebûn LGBT Diyarbakır Organization
 İLLET İstanbul anti-authoritarian pleasure and resistance network of feminist women, trans, queer. İstanbul LGBT Solidarity Association.
 İstanbul LGBTT Solidarity Organization
 İTÜ Cins Arı LGBT Öğrenci Topluluğu
 İÜ Radar LGBT Öğrenci Topluluğu
 Kadın Kapısı (Women's door)
 Kaos Gay and Lesbian Cultural Research and Solidarity Association
 LİSTAG – Istanbul group of Families of LGBT
 luBUnya Boğaziçi Üniversitesi LGBT Society
 MorEl Eskişehir LGBTT Organization
 ODTÜ LGBT Dayanışması
 Pembe Hayat LGBTT Solidarity Association
 Sabancı Üniversitesi Gender Club
 Siyah Pembe Üçgen İzmir LGBTT Association
 Voltrans Trans Erkek Initiative
 SPoD Social Policies, Gender Identity and Sexual Orientation Studies Association

Other institutions and organizations that contribute to the pride march are:

 Amnesty International
 Anadolu Kültür
 Open Society Foundations
 Rattenbar

Political impact 
Politicians that have joined Istanbul Pride are mainly from the opposition parties HDP and CHP, and include:

 Filiz Kerestecioğlu
 Ertuğrul Kürkçü
 
 Sırrı Süreyya Önder
 Mahmut Tanal
 Sebahat Tuncel

They call upon the Turkish authorities to guarantee fundamental rights and civil liberties to all LGBT people.

In 2019, several opposition held municipalities have shown support to the LGBTI community on social media. Mersin, Edirne, Tarsus, Eskişehir, Izmir, Bodrum. Istanbul's local governments such as Ataşehir, Beşiktaş, Şişli, Kadıköy, Maltepe, Kartal also showed their sympathy. 

In 2019, shortly after the 2019 Turkish local elections opposition politician and Mayor of Istanbul Ekrem İmamoğlu stated that the ban can't be unruled as the right to give permission to demonstrations lies with the governorship and the governors of Turkish provinces are not elected but directly appointed by the presidency.

See also 
 LGBT rights in Turkey

References

External links 

 PrideIstanbul.org 

2003 establishments in Turkey
Annual events in Turkey
LGBT events in Turkey
Festivals in Istanbul
July events
June events
LGBT culture in Turkey
LGBT in Turkey
LGBT organizations in Turkey
Organizations based in Istanbul
Pride parades
Recurring events established in 2003
Summer events in Turkey